South Korean pop group TVXQ, known as  in Japanese releases, have released 74 singles (including 1 as a co-featuring artist), 3 featured appearances, and 27 soundtrack appearances. The group signed with S.M. Entertainment in 2003 and released their debut single "Hug" in January 2004, peaking at number four on the Monthly Albums Chart of the Music Industry Association of Korea (MIAK). Their following single "The Way U Are", released in June 2004, entered the MIAK Monthly Albums Chart at number one.

In late 2004, TVXQ signed with Japan's Avex Group to launch their Japanese music career. They first issued the English version of "Hug" in November 2004, which was then followed by the release of their debut Japanese single "Stay with Me Tonight" in April 2005, peaking at number thirty-seven on the Oricon Singles Chart. They achieved their first top-three single in Japan the following year with "Miss You / 'O'-Sei.Han.Gō.", and in 2008, they scored their first number-one Japanese single with "Purple Line". Its accompanying studio album T spawned six top-five singles on the Oricon.

In September 2008, TVXQ released their fourth Korean studio album Mirotic. The album's title single became one of TVXQ's biggest worldwide hits – it topped digital charts across most major Asian music markets, and became a signature song for the Hallyu. The group's fourth Japanese studio album The Secret Code, released in March 2009, repeated Mirotic's success, spawning four number-one singles on the Oricon. The single "Dōshite Kimi o Suki ni Natte Shimattandarō?" (2008) was the album's best-selling single, receiving a gold certification from the Recording Industry Association of Japan (RIAJ) after only one week of release. It went on to receive two platinum certifications in digital downloads in 2014.

The singles following "Survivor" (2009) cemented TVXQ's commercial success in Japan. The group scored their best-selling hit with "Share the World", receiving three platinum certifications in digital downloads from the RIAJ. The single, released in April 2009, was part of the soundtrack for the anime, One Piece. In 2010, TVXQ released their first platinum-certified singles "Break Out!" and "Toki o Tomete". The latter was TVXQ's last single to feature members Jaejoong, Yoochun, and Junsu.

TVXQ restarted their career as a duo with members Yunho and Changmin in January 2011. Their first single "Keep Your Head Down" debuted at number five on South Korea's Gaon Singles Chart and number one on Japan's Oricon, receiving a platinum certification from the RIAJ one week after release. "Keep Your Head Down" is one of TVXQ's biggest hits in Japan; it topped music charts across the country, earning a platinum certification in digital downloads. All of the duo's singles released after "Keep Your Head Down" have charted within the top three. With a total of twelve number-one singles recorded on the Oricon, TVXQ is highest-ranking foreign music act in Japan. They have since sold more than 4.2 million physical singles there, making them the best-selling international artist of all-time in CD singles.

Singles

Promotional singles

Featured appearances

As featured artists

As SM Town

Soundtrack appearances

Other charted songs

See also
TVXQ albums discography
TVXQ videography
List of songs recorded by TVXQ
List of awards and nominations received by TVXQ

Notes
A  Prior to the establishment of the Gaon Music Chart in 2010, South Korea's music charts were supplied by the Music Industry Association of Korea (MIAK), which stopped compiling data in 2008. There are no known cumulative chart records for digital singles prior to 2010.
B  The first issue date of the Billboard K-Pop Hot 100 was on August 25, 2011. The chart was discontinued after the May 17, 2014 issue date.
C  The first issue date of the Billboard Japan Hot 100 was on March 3, 2008.
D  The Recording Industry Association of Japan (RIAJ) supplies the music recording sales certification in Japan. Until July 27, 2012, Chaku-uta Full (cellphone downloads), Chaku-uta (ringtones) and regular PC Haishin (PC digital download) sales were charted separately by the RIAJ on the RIAJ Digital Track Chart. The chart was discontinued after July 27, 2012. On February 28, 2014, the Chaku-uta Full and PC categories were merged to create the Single Track (digital download) category.
Specific

References

Discography
Discographies of South Korean artists
K-pop music group discographies